Ivorian may refer to:

Country
 Something of, from, or related to the country of Ivory Coast
 A person from Ivory Coast, or of Ivorian descent (for information about the Ivorian people, see Demographics of Ivory Coast and Culture of Ivory Coast)
 Specified Persons List of Ivorians
 Note that there is no language called "Ivorian" (for languages spoken in Ivory Coast, see Languages of Ivory Coast)

Other
Ivorian stage, in British stratigraphy a stage in the lower Carboniferous

Language and nationality disambiguation pages
Demonyms